Bowers v. Kerbaugh-Empire Co., 271 U.S. 170 (1926), was a case in which the United States Supreme Court held that no taxable income arose from the repayment in German marks of loans that had originally been made in U.S. dollars, despite the fact that the marks had gone down in value relative to the dollar since the loan had been made.

This decision was narrowed by the court six years later in United States v. Kirby Lumber Co..

See also
 List of United States Supreme Court cases, volume 271

External links
 
  

United States Supreme Court cases
United States Supreme Court cases of the Taft Court
United States Sixteenth Amendment case law
United States taxation and revenue case law
1926 in United States case law
Foreign exchange market
Germany–United States relations